Universidad Metropolitana de Monterrey is a private university founded in the late 1980s, located in the Metropolitan area of Monterrey, Mexico.

Private universities and colleges in Mexico
Universities in Monterrey
1996 establishments in Mexico